The Fortress of Kaysun  is located near the village of Çakırhüyük, which used to be named Keysun, in the Adıyaman Province of rural southeastern Turkey. The fortress was a stronghold of the crusader County of Edessa. In 1131, the Danishmend Emir Gazi besieged the place. Joscelin I, Count of Edessa, hastened to relieve the defenders and died somewhere in the vicinity.

References

External links
 About Keysun

County of Edessa
Crusader castles
Buildings and structures in Adıyaman Province
1130s in the Crusader states